Surl is an unincorporated community in southeastern Person County, North Carolina, United States, located north of Moriah and five miles (8 km) east of Somerset.

References

 

Unincorporated communities in Person County, North Carolina
Unincorporated communities in North Carolina